Symmachia calligrapha is a butterfly species of the family Riodinidae. It is present in Brazil (Pará) and French Guiana.

See also 
 List of butterflies of French Guiana

References

External links

 

Symmachia
Fauna of Brazil
Lepidoptera of French Guiana
Butterflies described in 1867
Riodinidae of South America
Taxa named by William Chapman Hewitson